Piura is a city in northwestern Peru located in the Sechura Desert on the Piura River. It is the capital of the Piura Region and the Piura Province. Its population was 484,475 as of 2017.

It was here that Spanish Conqueror Francisco Pizarro founded the third Spanish city in South America and first in Peru, San Miguel de Piura, in July or August 1532. Piura declared its independence from Spain on 4 January 1821.

History

Like most of northern Peru, the territory of Piura has been inhabited by their autochthonous group of natives called tallanes and yungas. These groups lived without an organization or single leader to rule until the Muchik culture eventually took control, and the mixture of these evolved into the Vicús culture. Centuries later, Piura came under the rule of Tupac Inca Yupanqui for at least 40 years before the Spanish arrived.

Francisco Pizarro came to the area and established it as the third Spanish city in South America, and Spain's first city in Peru.
With the arrival of the Spanish in 1532, the current mestizo and creole cultures of Piura were born. This mestizo culture includes influences from Spanish Extremadura and Andalucia; African influence, owing to the arrival of slaves from Madagascar (Malgache slaves); Chinese coolies who migrated from Canton to work the rice fields and replace the slaves; and also Roma Gypsies who came as pirates looking for pearls, or incognito as Spanish horsemen.

The Spanish named the city from the Quechuan word pirhua, meaning "abundance". Nowadays, Piura is known as the "Ciudad del eterno calor" meaning "The city of eternal heat" because it is hot all year round.

Geography

Climate 
Piura Department has a desert and semi-desert climate on the coast and the western slopes of the Andes, whereas on the eastern slopes the climate is subtropical. Precipitation is sparse except during El Niño events, when rainfall is abundant and water flows through normally dry watercourses, causing flooding and large-scale land movements.

Hydrography
The hydrography of Piura Department is determined mainly by the amount of rainfall originating in the Pacific Ocean. This rainfall is itself determined by the meeting of two ocean currents on the southern coast of the department, around the bay of Sechura: the cold Humboldt current at 13-19 °C, and the warm El Niño at 21-27 °C. These conditions lead to fluctuations in offshore sea temperatures, which are 18-23 °C in winter and spring, and 23-27 °C in summer and sometimes in autumn.

The mean annual humidity is 66%. The mean atmospheric pressure is 1008.5 hPa, while winds are mainly from the north at an average speed of 3 m/s. Annual rainfall varies between 10 and 200 mm at altitudes of 100–500 m; between 200 and 800 mm at altitudes of 500–1500 m; and averages 1,550 mm at altitudes above 1500 m.

Most of the region is arid, with rainfall concentrated in the high Andean areas, while on the wide plains the main water sources are seasonal rivers flowing from the north: the Chira and the Piura. The southern half of the plain consists of the Sechura Desert, which supports herbaceous vegetation.

The main rivers are the Piura, the Huancabamba and the Chira. The reservoir of Poechos has been created within the course of the Chira. It has a capacity of 1,000,000,000 cubic metres and irrigates large portions of the coastal region. The river Quiroz, a tributary of the Piura, supplies the huge artificial lake of San Lorenzo. On the Huancabamba, in the mountains, there is a hydroelectric power station supplying energy to the region.

Tourism
One of the best-known tourist attractions in Piura is La Esmeralda beach, known as Colan beach for it is located near the town of Colan. It is a very long beach with warm waters. Local people like to go there during holidays.

There are also great spots for surfers, like Playa Cangrejos, Mancora Beach and Cabo Blanco. Cabo Blanco was made famous by visitor Ernest Hemingway in 1956, where he supervised the filming of The Old Man and the Sea.

Transportation
Piura is served by the Cap. FAP Guillermo Concha Iberico International Airport.

The Tren de la Costa is planned.

Culture and folklore

Piura is host to a stunning mestizo culture (one of the oldest in South America, for Piura is the third Spanish city founded on that continent) most famous for gastronomical dishes like Seco de chabelo, algarrobina-based drinks, many types of seafood and fish, like ceviche and Natilla Sweets. Popular crafts include Chulucana pottery, and Catacaos is famous for its hats and its silversmithing. The small town of Simbila, is very popular for its handcrafts and pottery. The tondero and cumanana are the traditional music of mestizo Piura and northern parts of Lambayeque. There are also several famous Peruvian Waltz that came from these regions (northern Peruvians have their own style).

Universities 
 University of Piura (UDEP)
 National University of Piura (UNP)

Branches of:
Peruvian Wings University (UAP)
César Vallejo University (UCV)
The Angels of Chimbote University (ULADECH)
Antenor Orrego Private University (UPAO)
Saint Peter University (USP)

Churches 
 Iglesia Catedral de Piura was founded in 1588, located in the Plena Plaza de Armas, is an icon of the city
 Iglesia San Francisco was founded by the Franciscan Order
 Iglesia San Sebastian was founded in 1911
 Iglesia/Santuario María Auxiliadora 
Powerhouse Peru
 La Iglesia de JesuCristo de Los Santos de Los Ultimos Días

Notable people
 

Francisco del Castillo Andraca (1716–1770), Peruvian poet, writer and priest

Sister cities
 Empalme, Mexico
 Loja, Ecuador
 Oklahoma City, United States
 Trujillo, Spain

References

External links

 
 
 

Populated places in the Piura Region
Cities in Peru
Populated places established in 1532
1532 establishments in the Spanish Empire
Regional capital cities in Peru